Cubby House were an Australian rock'n'roll band aimed at 3 to 8-year-olds. Their album Rock Cake was nominated for the ARIA Award for Best Children's Album in 1999.

Members
Annerose de Jong - vocals
Kerry Digby - drums
Stephen Knight - bass and mandolin
Jenni Milnes - guitar, keyboards, harmonica and vocals
Jason Rooke - guitar and vocals
Peter Winkler - producer and director

Discography

Albums
Rock the House (1997) - ABC Music
Rock Cake (1998) - Festival Records

Awards and nominations

ARIA Music Awards

References

Australian children's musical groups
Australian rock music groups
Musical groups established in 1997
Musical groups disestablished in 1999